The Central District of Dargaz County is a district (bakhsh) in Dargaz County, Razavi Khorasan Province, Iran. At the 2006 census, its population was 40,197, in 10,823 families.  The district has one city: Dargaz.  The district has one rural district (dehestan): Takab Rural District.

References 

Districts of Razavi Khorasan Province
Dargaz County